House of the Tiger King is a travel journal in which Anglo-Afghan author Tahir Shah recounts his search for the legendary Inca city Paititi. The book was first published by John Murray in 2004. Its title is a translation of a Machiguenga name for Paititi.

House of the Tiger King was read by Sam Dastor on BBC Radio 4's Book of the Week in July 2004.

Overview
There is a story that before the Spanish Conquistadors invaded and destroyed the last bastion of the Inca empire, Vilcabamba, in 1572, the Inca citizens fled from there, and built a magnificent city in a remote part of the cloud forest. Travel writer Tahir Shah, like many before him, seeks this legendary city—Paititi. Shah begins in the Madre de Dios Region of southeastern Peru. Among his party are a Machiguenga guide called Pancho, and Richard Fowler, a wilderness guide hired by Shah for physical security.

The project was also the basis for a documentary feature film of the same name, directed by David Flamholc.

References

External links
 

2003 non-fiction books
British travel books
Exploration of South America
Books by Tahir Shah
Books about Peru
John Murray (publishing house) books
English non-fiction books